Sergio Hernández von Rekowski (born 6 December 1983, Xàbia) is a Spanish racing driver, best known for having competed in the World Touring Car Championship. He won the WTCC Independents' Trophy in 2008 and 2010.

Career

Early years
Hernández's career started in karting in 1998, lasting until 2001 when he moved up to formula racing with Portuguese Formula BMW and Spanish Formula Toyota.

In 2002 he debuted in Spanish Formula Three, driving for the Azteca team, where he would stay for 2003. In 2003 he also drove for Azteca in British Formula 3, driving some races. He also drove part of the World Series Light season. He remained in Spanish F3 for 2004, only moving to the Campos team. He got a taste of World Series by Nissan, driving part of the season for the Saulnier team.

GP2 Series
In 2005 he drove in the GP2 Series, partnered with Juan Cruz Álvarez, although Campos struggled throughout the season. He moved to Durango for 2006, partnering Lucas di Grassi, but results were even more sparse. During the GP2 season finale at Valencia, he drove for the Trident Racing team, replacing Ricardo Risatti who had himself replaced the injured Pastor Maldonado for three race meetings.

World Touring Car Championship

Proteam Motorsport (2007–2008; 2010)
Hernández switched to touring cars in 2007, racing a BMW 320si for Proteam Motorsport in the 2007 World Touring Car Championship season. He finished 20th in the drivers' standings that season after participating in nine of the eleven rounds.

He continued to race for Proteam in 2008 alongside Stefano D'Aste. He took his first outright podium finish at the 2008 FIA WTCC Race of Japan, finishing third behind Tom Coronel and Augusto Farfus in the drying conditions of race one. That year he won the Independents' Trophy for the first time.

He rejoined Proteam in 2010 after BMW reduced their involvement in the series.

BMW Team Italy–Spain (2009)
In 2009 he joined the works BMW Team Italy-Spain, replacing Félix Porteiro as teammate to Alessandro Zanardi.

He failed to get through to Q2 for the Race of Brazil but started ahead of his teammate. He finished in the points in his first race as a works driver. While letting his teammate pass during qualifying for the Race of Morocco, Hernández clashed with fellow BMW driver Andy Priaulx and finished the session nineteenth. Hernández retired from race two on the opening lap and his stranded car brought out the safety car. After qualifying for the Race of France, he was one of seven drivers who had their times from Q2 deleted for exceeding the engine rev limit on theirs cars. He finished fifth in race one but a collision with Porteiro on the first lap put Hernández out of the race and his BMW 320si caught fire, Porteiro was issued with a drive–through penalty for his involvement. He started on pole position for the reversed grid race at the Race of Spain but dropped down to sixth by the end of the race. Hernández took his first overall WTCC victory in race two of the Race of the Czech Republic, having started on the second row and passed pole sitter Yvan Muller on the third lap. Race one of the Race of Portugal saw Hernandez and the Lada of Jaap van Lagen, who started 17th and 18th respectively tangle after the rolling start, pitching Hernandez in the concrete barrier. He was subsequently taken to hospital for checks on his ankle and was unable to start race two. Contact from SEAT Sport driver Jordi Gené during race two of the Race of Italy spun Hernández and dropped him down the order and he eventually finished eleventh. He finished the season eleventh in the drivers' championship as the fourth best BMW factory driver and one place ahead of his teammate. In December 2009, BMW announced it was to reduce its involvement in the WTCC from five cars to two. ROAL Motorsport would no longer be involved with the German manufacturer, leaving Hernández to find a seat himself for 2010.

Racing record

Complete GP2 Series results
(key) (Races in bold indicate pole position) (Races in italics indicate fastest lap)

Complete World Touring Car Championship results
(key) (Races in bold indicate pole position) (Races in italics indicate fastest lap)

Complete International Superstars Series results
(key) (Races in bold indicate pole position) (Races in italics indicate fastest lap)

References

External links

 Sergio Hernández official website 
 Career statistics at driverdb.com.

1983 births
Living people
People from Xàbia
Spanish racing drivers
Sportspeople from the Province of Alicante
GP2 Series drivers
World Touring Car Championship drivers
Euroformula Open Championship drivers
British Formula Three Championship drivers
European Le Mans Series drivers
Superstars Series drivers
Campos Racing drivers
Durango drivers
Trident Racing drivers
BMW M drivers
RC Motorsport drivers
OAK Racing drivers